Thyge Alexander Petersen (28 May 1902 – 1 January 1964) was a Danish light heavyweight amateur boxer who competed in the 1920s. He won the European championship in 1925 and 1930.

Biography
Thyge Petersen was born on 28 May 1902 in Horsens, Denmark. In 1922 he won the regional championship for Jutland as a middleweight. The following year he won the Danish championship in the light heavyweight division and in 1924 he won the regional Jutland-championship as well as the Danish championship. Later in 1924 he won a silver medal in boxing at the 1924 Summer Olympics in Paris, losing against the British boxer Harry Mitchell in the final bout.

After the Olympics Thyge Petersen remained an amateur boxer and won the regional Jutland championship three times (1925–26 and 1928) and the Danish championship four times (1925, 1927–28 and 1930. In 1926 he won the Danish championship as a heavyweight. He also won the Amateur Boxing Association of England 1926 heavyweight title.

Thyge Petersen participated in the 1925 European Amateur Boxing Championships and the 1930 European Amateur Boxing Championships and won the European championship in light heavyweight on both occasions. Winning two European championships, an olympic silver medal, 7 national and 4 regional championships, Thyge Petersen is one of the most successful Danish amateur boxers.

He died on 1 January 1964.

References

External links
profile

1902 births
1964 deaths
Danish male boxers
Light-heavyweight boxers
Olympic boxers of Denmark
Boxers at the 1924 Summer Olympics
Olympic silver medalists for Denmark
England Boxing champions
Olympic medalists in boxing
Medalists at the 1924 Summer Olympics
People from Horsens
Sportspeople from the Central Denmark Region